The 1947 NFL Championship Game was the 15th annual National Football League (NFL) championship game, held December 28 at Comiskey Park in Chicago. The attendance was 30,759, well 

The game featured the Western Division champion Chicago Cardinals  and the Eastern Division champion Philadelphia Eagles  A week earlier, the Eagles defeated the Pittsburgh Steelers  in a tiebreaker playoff to determine the Eastern winner. Both the Eagles and Cardinals were making their first appearances in the championship game. The Cardinals had won the regular season meeting in Philadelphia three weeks earlier by 24 points and after a week off, were 12-point favorites to win the title game 

This was the second NFL title game played after Christmas Day, and the latest to date. Scheduled for December 21, it was pushed back due to the Eastern division playoff. The temperature at kickoff 

The Cardinals built a 14–0 lead in the second quarter, then the teams traded touchdowns. The Eagles closed the gap to 28–21 with five minutes to go, but the Cardinals controlled the ball the rest of the game on an extended drive to win the title.

This was the only NFL title game played at Comiskey Park and remains as the Cardinals' only win. The two teams returned for a rematch in 1948 in Philadelphia, but the Eagles won in a snowstorm. The Cardinals have not won a league championship since this one, over seven decades ago, the longest drought in the NFL. They made it to Super Bowl XLIII in the 2008 season representing Arizona, but lost to the Pittsburgh Steelers.

The Cardinals' win kept the NFL title within the city of Chicago; the North Side's Bears had won the previous season.

This was the Cardinals' last playoff win as a franchise until January 1999; at 51 years and five days, it was the longest post-season win drought in NFL history, and still holds the current record for the longest title drought in North American sports. They relocated to St. Louis as the St. Louis Cardinals in 1960 and Arizona as the Phoenix Cardinals in 1988 (changing their name to Arizona Cardinals in 1994).

Scoring summary
Sunday, December 28, 1947
Kickoff: 1:05 p.m. CST

First quarter
CHI – Charley Trippi 44 run (Pat Harder kick), 7–0 CHI
Second quarter
CHI – Elmer Angsman 70 run (Harder kick), 14–0 CHI
PHI – McHugh 53 pass from Tommy Thompson (Cliff Patton kick), 14–7 CHI
Third quarter
CHI – Trippi 75 punt return (Harder kick), 21–7 CHI
PHI – Steve Van Buren 1 run (Patton kick), 21–14 CHI
Fourth quarter
CHI – Angsman 70 run (Harder kick), 28–14 CHI
PHI – Russ Craft 1 run (Patton kick), 28–21 CHI

Officials

Referee: Thomas Dowd
Umpire: Harry Robb
Head Linesman: Dan Tehan
Back Judge: Carl Rebele 
Field Judge: Henry Haines 

Alternate: Carl Brubaker 

Players' shares
Each player on the Cardinals received $1,132, while the losing Eagles got $754.

References

Champ
1947 NFL Championship Game
Chicago Cardinals postseason
Philadelphia Eagles postseason
December 1947 sports events in the United States
1940s in Chicago
Sports competitions in Chicago
American football in Chicago